Alberto Isidori  was born on January 24, 1942, in Rapallo and is an Italian control theorist. He is a Professor of Automatic Control at the University of Rome and an 	Affiliate Professor of Electrical & Systems Engineering at Washington University in St. Louis. He is well known as the author of the book Nonlinear Control Systems, one of the most highly cited references in nonlinear control.

He is a Fellow of the IEEE and IFAC. He received the 1996 IFAC Georgio Quazza Medal, and was named as the recipient of the 2012 IEEE Control Systems Award.

Publications

References

External links
 Biography
 Website at University of Rome "La Sapienza"

Control theorists
People from Rapallo
Living people
Academic staff of the Sapienza University of Rome
Washington University in St. Louis faculty
Fellow Members of the IEEE
Fellows of the International Federation of Automatic Control
Year of birth missing (living people)